The Biosphäre Potsdam (7,000 m²) is an indoor tropical botanical garden located in the Volkspark Potsdam, a park between the Sanssouci Park and the Neuer Garten Potsdam (New Garden) at Georg-Hermann-Allee 99, Potsdam, Brandenburg, Germany. It is open daily; an admission fee is charged.

The garden contains approximately 20,000 tropical plants representing about 350 species, including orchids, epiphytes, and trees about 14 metres in height, including a palm grove and mangrove swamp. It also includes tropical crops, a waterfall, two lakes, and various types of tropical wildlife, including iguanas, snakes, spiders, frogs, geckos, and pheasants, as well as a butterfly house containing about 30 butterfly species.

See also 
 Botanischer Garten Potsdam
 List of botanical gardens in Germany

References 

 Biosphäre Potsdam
 CityTourCard entry
 Qype entry, with photographs
 ArchInfo entry

Potsdam, Biosphare
Potsdam, Biosphare
Tourist attractions in Potsdam